This is a list of winners and nominees of the Primetime Emmy Award for Outstanding Supporting Actor in a Drama Series. In early Primetime Emmy Award ceremonies, the supporting categories were not always genre, or even gender, specific. Beginning with the 22nd Primetime Emmy Awards, supporting actors in drama have competed alone. However, these dramatic performances often included actors from miniseries, telefilms, and guest performers competing against main cast competitors. Such instances are marked below:

 # – Indicates a performance in a Miniseries or Television film, prior to the category's creation
 § – Indicates a performance as a guest performer, prior to the category's creation

FOX is the only one of the Big Four networks to not win this category, with only one nomination.

Winners and nominations

1950s

1960s

1970s

1980s

1990s

2000s

2010s

2020s

Programs with multiple wins

4 wins
 Game of Thrones (2 consecutive)
 L.A. Law (3 consecutive)
 The West Wing (3 consecutive)

3 wins
 The Andy Griffith Show (consecutive)
 Breaking Bad
 Hill Street Blues (2 consecutive)
 Picket Fences (consecutive)

2 wins
 Caesar's Hour
 The Crown
 The Jackie Gleason Show
 Gunsmoke
 Lost
 The Rockford Files (consecutive)
 The Sopranos (consecutive)

Programs with multiple nominations

16 nominations
 Hill Street Blues

15 nominations
 L.A. Law

14 nominations
 The West Wing

12 nominations
 Game of Thrones

9 nominations
 The Sopranos

8 nominations
 ER
 Lost

7 nominations
 Breaking Bad
 St. Elsewhere

6 nominations
 Better Call Saul
 Boston Legal
 Lou Grant
 The Rockford Files
 Succession
 The Waltons

5 nominations
 Chicago Hope
 Downton Abbey
 The Handmaid's Tale
 I Love Lucy
 Mad Men
 NYPD Blue
 Picket Fences
 thirtysomething

4 nominations
 Damages
 The Good Wife
 Homeland
 House of Cards
 Magnum, P.I.
 Marcus Welby, M.D.
 Northern Exposure
 The Practice
 Quantum Leap

3 nominations
 Alias
 The Andy Griffith Show
 Caesar's Hour
 Cagney & Lacey
 The Crown
 Gunsmoke
 The Jackie Gleason Show
 Law & Order
 Mission: Impossible
 The Morning Show
 Star Trek
 The Streets of San Francisco
 This Is Us

2 nominations
 Ben Casey
 Bloodline
 Dragnet
 The Glass Menagerie
 Holocaust
 Huff
 The Man from U.N.C.L.E.
 Men of a Certain Age
 Miami Vice
 Perry Mason
 The Phil Silvers Show
 Ray Donovan
 Rich Man, Poor Man
 Severance
 Squid Game
 Stranger Things
 Westworld

Performers with multiple wins

4 wins
 Peter Dinklage (2 consecutive)

3 wins
 Art Carney (consecutive)
 Don Knotts (consecutive)
 Aaron Paul

2 wins
 Michael Conrad (consecutive)
 Larry Drake (consecutive)
 Stuart Margolin (consecutive)
 Carl Reiner (consecutive)
 Ray Walston (consecutive)

Performers with multiple nominations

8 nominations
 Peter Dinklage

6 nominations
 Jonathan Banks
 Ed Begley Jr.
 Will Geer
 Jimmy Smits
 Bruce Weitz

5 nominations
 William Frawley
 Michael Imperioli
 Aaron Paul
 William Shatner
 John Spencer
 Bradley Whitford
 Noah Wyle

4 nominations 
 James Brolin
 Timothy Busfield
 Art Carney
 Jim Carter
 Michael Conrad
 Richard Dysart
 Héctor Elizondo
 Michael Emerson
 Giancarlo Esposito
 John Hillerman
 Michael Kelly
 Mandy Patinkin
 Carl Reiner
 John Slattery
 Dean Stockwell

3 nominations
 Mason Adams
 Noah Beery Jr.
 Michael Douglas
 Larry Drake
 Paul Ford
 Victor Garber
 John Karlen
 Don Knotts
 Eriq La Salle
 Greg Morris
 Leonard Nimoy
 Terry O'Quinn
 Richard Schiff
 Robert Walden
 Ray Walston

2 nominations
 Alan Alda
 Ben Alexander
 Michael Badalucco
 Andre Braugher
 Nicholas Braun
 David Burns
 Leo G. Carroll
 Josh Charles
 Dominic Chianese
 Gordon Clapp
 Barry Corbin
 Nikolaj Coster-Waldau
 Billy Crudup
 Kieran Culkin
 Alan Cumming
 Fyvush Finkel
 Charles Haid
 David Harbour
 Steve Harris
 Steven Hill
 John Lithgow
 Matthew Macfadyen
 Stuart Margolin
 Ben Mendelsohn
 Edward James Olmos
 Oliver Platt
 Chris Sullivan
 Nicholas Turturro
 Jon Voight
 Dennis Weaver
 Jeffrey Wright

See also
 Primetime Emmy Award for Outstanding Supporting Actor in a Comedy Series
 Golden Globe Award for Best Supporting Actor – Series, Miniseries or Television Film

Notes

References

Supporting Actor - Drama Series
 
Emmy Award